DMR is an initialism that may refer to:

Biology
 Differentially methylated regions, a genomic region that is methylated differentially on each parental allele
 Dwarf mistletoe rating system, a scale for rating the severity of a dwarf mistletoe infection

Government
 Device Master Record, a folder containing a technical description of a device controlled by regulating authorities (such as the US Food and Drug Administration)
 Discharge Monitoring Report, submission report to the United States Environmental Protection Agency
 Department of Main Roads (New South Wales), Australia
 Department of Main Roads (Queensland), Australia

Media
 Dance Music Report, bi-weekly U.S. trade magazine
 The Des Moines Register, daily morning newspaper in Des Moines, Iowa
 DMR Books, small Chicago-based book publisher

Technology
 Differential Microwave Radiometer, an instrument on the Cosmic Background Explorer satellite
 Digital mobile radio, open digital radio standard for professional mobile radio and amateur radio users 
 Dual modular redundancy, redundancy back-up system
 IMAX Digital Media Remastering, a process re-rendering regular movies for display on IMAX screens

People
 Dennis MacAlistair Ritchie (1941–2011), American computer scientist

Other uses
 Designated marksman rifle, weapon used by a squad designated marksman in a United States Army's fireteam infantry squad
 Designated Member Review, where a committee designates one or more members of the committee to review a decision-making process or a protocol or procedure
 Direct market reseller, also known as an e-tailer, a company that sells directly to consumers online without operating storefront operations
 Distance medley relay, a track event consisting of 1,200, 400, 800, and 1,600-meter legs
 Divergent modes of religiosity, a theory of the growth and development of religions